Petros was a great white pelican. It was the official mascot of the Greek island of Mykonos.

In 1958, a wounded pelican was found off the coast of Mykonos by a local fisherman. The pelican was nursed to health and remained on the island supported by locals. It soon adopted the name "Petros", as a joke among locals, as "petro" in Greek means "rock" or "stone", but metaphorically "old and grumpy". Petros was hit and killed by a car in  December 1985.

Subsequently, three new pelicans took up residence around the main town of Mykonos. One, honorifically, was given the name "Petros".

See also
 List of individual birds

References

External links

1985 animal deaths
Greek culture
Individual pelicans
Mykonos
Bird mascots
Individual animals in Greece